Jacob "Jake" Spiker Gibb (born February 6, 1976) is an American professional beach volleyball player, who currently plays on the AVP Tour with Taylor Crabb as his partner. Gibb and Casey Patterson represented the United States at the 2016 Summer Olympics. Previously, Gibb and Sean Rosenthal played together from 2006 to 2012. The duo represented Team USA at the 2008 and 2012 Olympic Games.

Personal life
Gibb was born and raised in Bountiful, Utah, where he played golf and basketball. His middle name is his mother's maiden name, Spiker. He did not play volleyball in college, but attended the University of Utah and graduated in 2002 with a degree in business. It was not until he turned 21 that he took up the sport of beach volleyball with his twin brother, Coleman. He has ten brothers and sisters.

Gibb is a two-time cancer survivor. He was diagnosed with testicular cancer in 2010 and also had a malignant melanoma removed from his left shoulder in 2002.

He and his wife, Jane, were married in 2000 and moved to Southern California in 2002. They reside in Huntington Beach, California.

Career

Partners 
 2000–2002: Mike Daniel
 2003: Ty Loomis
 2004: Adam Jewell
 2005: Stein Metzger
 2006–2013: Sean Rosenthal
 2013–2016: Casey Patterson
 2017–2021: Taylor Crabb

AVP
Before partnering up with Crabb in 2017, he previously played with Sean Rosenthal, Mike Daniel, Stein Metzger, Ty Loomis and Adam Jewell. In 2005 with Stein Metzger, the duo played in 14 AVP events and won four, which led the tour. They also finished second three times and third five times.

In 2006, Gibb and Rosenthal played in 16 AVP events and won one – the very first event they played together. In 2007, they played in 17 AVP events and won two. They also finished second seven times and third twice. In 2008, they beat top-ranked American duo Phil Dalhausser and Todd Rogers in the final AVP Tour event before the 2008 Beijing Olympics in Long Beach, California. Overall, they played seven AVP Tour events in 2008 and won two, and also placed second in two.

AVP honors
2005
AVP Most Valuable Player
AVP Team of the Year (with Metzger)
FIVB Top Rookie
2004
AVP Most Improved Player

Olympics
Gibb made his Olympic debut at the 2008 Summer Olympics with Rosenthal. The team made it to the quarterfinals before losing to Brazilian duo of Ricardo Santos and Emanuel Rego. Gibb and Rosenthal finished 5th again at the 2012 London Olympics when they lost to the Latvian team. Although it was a disappointing finish at the London Olympics, Gibb and Rosenthal finished 1st in the world on the FIVB tour. After a great year, Gibb and Rosenthal decided to conclude their partnership and play with other teammates. The next year, Gibb began to play with Casey Patterson.

Gibb participated with Tri Bourne after Taylor Crabb withdrew due to COVID-19 at the 2020 Summer Olympics in 2021, at age 45, making him the oldest ever Olympic Beach Volleyball competitor and finished 9th.

References

External links
 
 
 
 
 
 

1976 births
Living people
American men's beach volleyball players
Olympic beach volleyball players of the United States
Beach volleyball players at the 2008 Summer Olympics
Beach volleyball players at the 2012 Summer Olympics
Beach volleyball players at the 2016 Summer Olympics
Beach volleyball players at the 2020 Summer Olympics
Sportspeople from Salt Lake City
University of Utah alumni
Latter Day Saints from Utah